I'm Having Fun Now is the debut studio album by Jenny and Johnny - a collaboration between Jenny Lewis and Johnathan Rice. It was released in 2010.

Track listing

References

2010 debut albums
Jenny Lewis albums
Warner Records albums